Tim Powell, born Timothy Martin Powell (born 21 June 1979), is a British songwriter, producer and mixer. Powell was a member of the writing and production house, Xenomania, for fourteen years. His first hit "All I Wanna Do" for Dannii Minogue peaked at number four in the UK Singles Chart in 1997. In his fourteen years at Xenomania, Powell contributed to hit records such as "Hole in the Head" and "Round Round" by Sugababes, "Call the Shots" by Girls Aloud and "Love etc." by Pet Shop Boys.

In March 2010, Powell split from Xenomania to become an independent songwriter and producer. Following his departure, Powell co-wrote "I'm in Love" by Alex Gaudino and co-wrote and produced Ed Drewett's debut single "Champagne Lemonade", released in October 2010.

Powell collaborated again with Pet Shop Boys co-writing and producing their single, "Together", which features on their album Ultimate.

2012 saw Powell work and share writing and/or production credits with Paloma Faith's,"Picking Up the Pieces" (co-write), Saint Etienne for their album "Words & Music", Jess Mills single "For My Sins" and the third track on Little Mix's debut album DNA, "Change Your Life", released on 19 November 2012.

Powell collaborated with Pet Shop Boys for a third time in 2019 on the track "Give Stupidity a Chance" from their Agenda (EP).

Discography (released singles, date order)
 All I Wanna Do - Dannii Minogue
 Round Round - Sugababes
 Action - Saint Etienne
 Sound of the Underground - Girls Aloud
 Jump - Girls Aloud
 Hole In The Head - Sugababes
 In The Middle - Sugababes
 No Good Advice - Girls Aloud
 Giving You Up - Kylie Minogue
 Love Machine - Girls Aloud
 The Show - Girls Aloud
 Wake Me Up - Girls Aloud
 Biology - Girls Aloud
 Knock Down - Alesha Dixon
 Red Dress - Sugababes
 Something Kinda Ooooh - Girls Aloud
 Call The Shots - Girls Aloud
 Can't Speak French - Girls Aloud
 Sweet About Me - Gabriella Cilmi
 Save The Lies - Gabriella Cilmi
 Sanctuary - Gabriella Cilmi
 The Promise - Girls Aloud
 The Boy Does Nothing - Alesha Dixon
 My Love Is Better - Annie (Norwegian singer)
 Love Etc. - Pet Shop Boys
 Left My Heart In Tokyo - Mini Viva
 I Wish - Mini Viva
 Loving Kind - Girls Aloud
 Did You See Me Coming - Pet Shop Boys
 Untouchable - Girls Aloud
 One Touch - Mini Viva
 I'm In Love (I Wanna Do It) - Alex Gaudino
 Champagne Lemonade - Ed Drewett
 Together - Pet Shop Boys
 Tonight - Saint Etienne
 I've Got Your Music - Saint Etienne
 Picking Up the Pieces - Paloma Faith
 For My Sins - Jess Mills
 Good Intentions - Dappy
 Change Your Life -  Little Mix
 Take It Like A Man - Cher
 Man Enuff - M.O
 MK Ft Becky Hill - Piece of Me

References

External links
 Official Website

1979 births
Living people
British electronic musicians
British record producers
British dance musicians
Ivor Novello Award winners
Remixers
British songwriters
Xenomania